Heydarabad is a settlement and the capital of the Sadarak District of the Nakhchivan Autonomous Republic of Azerbaijan. It borders Armenia and before the First Nagorno-Karabakh War had road and rail connections with the Armenian village of Yeraskh on the other side of the border. It has a population of 2,000 as of 2013. It is the westernmost settlement of Azerbaijan.

History
The settlement was founded in the 1970s on the initiative of the President of Azerbaijan, Heydar Aliyev. By the decree of the Supreme Assembly of Nakhchivan AR dated on March 23, 2000, it was separated from Sədərək (Sadarak city) and turned to the settlement as an independent administrative unit. Because of the located in the border, several times it was subjected to armed aggression by Armenian forces. It was destroyed by artillery projectiles in 1992, its population became refugees and settled in the Sadarak village and in the other areas of Nakhchivan.

Starting from 1997-98 it was restored, was done a construction and improvement works and was built new office buildings and public facilities, shopping centers, etc. 75 residential buildings which were destroyed by Armenians has been renovated and restored on the eve of the 75th anniversary of Heydar Aliyev, on the initiative of the local population, the settlement was named "Heydarabad". Here is installed a 35/10 kV substation, was built a water pump station for direct the underground water-supply of Bulaqbaşı to the settlement and was built electric lines in the settlement. There are Wine Factory, secondary school, kindergarten, hospital, etc. in the settlement.

References 

Populated places in Sadarak District